This is a list of poets who were born in Ecuador or whose writings are closely associated with that country.

 Jorge Enrique Adoum
 Alfonso Barrera Valverde
 Paco Benavides
 Carlos Benavides Vega
 Luz Elisa Borja
 Arturo Borja
 Jorge Carrera Andrade
 Fanny Carrión
 Iván Carvajal Aguirre
 Fernando Cazón Vera
 Luis Chiriboga Izquierdo
 Maritza Cino
 Octavio Cordero Palacios
 Luis Alberto Costales
 Remigio Crespo Toral
 Diógenes Cuero
 Benigna Dávalos Villavicencio
 César Dávila Andrade
 Jorge Dávila Vázquez
 Rafael Díaz Ycaza
 Miguel Donoso Pareja
 José María Egas
 Iván Égüez
 Gonzalo Escudero
 Aurelio Espinosa Pólit
 María Fernanda Espinosa
 Ulises Estrella
 Nelson Estupiñán Bass
 Luis Félix López
 Humberto Fierro
 Luis Enrique Fierro
 Kléber Franco Cruz
 Jaime Galarza Zavala
 Karina Gálvez
 Alfredo Gangotena
 Agustín García Banderas
 Euler Granda
 Francisco Granizo
 Telmo Herrera
 Efraín Jara Idrovo
 Carlos Eduardo Jaramillo
 Ariruma Kowii
 Margarita Laso
 David Ledesma Vásquez
 Fanny León Cordero
 Violeta Luna
 Sonia Manzano
 Jorge Martillo
 Hugo Mayo
 Fernando Nieto Cadena
 Ernesto Noboa y Caamaño
 Iván Oñate
 Adalberto Ortiz
 Julio Pazos Barrera
 Raúl Pérez Torres
 Antonio Preciado
 Aleyda Quevedo
 Pedro Reino
 Ángel Vicente Ríos Maldonado
 Sergio Román Armendáriz
 Natasha Salguero
 Roy Sigüenza
 Medardo Ángel Silva
 Ricardo Torres Gavela
 Luis Francisco Urquizo Cuesta
 Jorge Velasco Mackenzie
 Pedro Jorge Vera
 Eduardo Villacís Meythaler
 Humberto Vinueza
 Alicia Yánez Cossío
 Luis Zúñiga

References

Poets